Ruben Arami Safrastyan (born 5 October 1955) is an Armenian historian and Turkologist who specializes in Turkish, Ottoman, genocide, Middle Eastern and regional studies. He is currently professor of history and Turkish studies at Yerevan State University and head researcher at the Institute of Oriental Studies of the Armenian National Academy of Sciences, of which he is a full member. He was director of the Institute of Oriental Studies from 2006 to 2020. He has also served as a counsellor of the Armenian Embassy in Germany. 

Safrastyan has authored or edited 12 books and 130 articles and papers. He is also the founding editor of the academic periodicals Turkic and Ottoman Studies (since 2002) and Contemporary Eurasia (since 2012), as well as editor of the academic yearbook Peoples and Countries of the Near and Middle East (Yerevan, Armenia).

Biography 

Ruben Safrastyan was born on 5 October 1955 in Yerevan. He is the grandson of noted Armenian Turkologist and educator Aram Safrastyan. In 1977, he graduated from the Faculty of Oriental Studies of Yerevan State University. From 1978 to 1980, he conducted his graduate studies on world history and Turkish history at the Institute of Oriental Studies of the Armenian National Academy of Sciences. In 1999, he won the Humboldt Prize and conducted research for a year at Ruhr University Bochum in Germany. In 2001, he received a Fulbright Fellowship and conducted for a year at the University of California, Berkeley. The next year, he received a fellowship to conduct research for a year at the Central European University in Budapest. He received the degree of Doctor of Historical Sciences in 2009. He became a corresponding member of the Armenian National Academy of Sciences in 2010 and a full member in 2014.

Safrastyan's honorary international activities include membership on the International Board of World Security Network Foundation, N.Y. (USA). He is also Senior Fellow at New Westminster College, Vancouver (Canada), and Senior Analyst at Wikistrat Inc, Washington, D.C. (USA). Safrastyan is a Member of Public Council of Armenia and Chairman of the Commission of Religion, Diaspora, and International Integration. For his professional achievements, Safrastyan has received several several state awards, most notably the Movses Khorenatsi Medal, Armenia's highest cultural award.

Sources

External links
Ruben Safrastyan's biography

Historians of Turkey
1955 births
Academic staff of Yerevan State University
Living people
Armenian orientalists
Soviet orientalists